Wayne Lakes is a village in Darke County, Ohio, United States. The population was 718 at the 2010 census.

Geography
Wayne Lakes is located at  (40.021184, -84.661788).

Demographics

2010 census
As of the census of 2010, there were 718 people, 304 households, and 214 families residing in the village. The racial makeup of the village was 98.2% White, 0.7% African American, 0.1% Native American, 0.1% from other races, and 0.8% from two or more races. Hispanic or Latino of any race were 0.4% of the population.

There were 304 households, of which 26.6% had children under the age of 18 living with them, 53.0% were married couples living together, 13.2% had a female householder with no husband present, 4.3% had a male householder with no wife present, and 29.6% were non-families. 22.4% of all households were made up of individuals, and 8.3% had someone living alone who was 65 years of age or older. The average household size was 2.36 and the average family size was 2.72.

The median age in the village was 43.6 years. 20.3% of residents were under the age of 18; 7.8% were between the ages of 18 and 24; 24% were from 25 to 44; 32.2% were from 45 to 64; and 15.9% were 65 years of age or older. The gender makeup of the village was 49.4% male and 50.6% female.

2000 census
As of the census of 2000, there were 684 people, 283 households, and 200 families residing in the village. The population density was 1,252.7 people per square mile (480.2/km). There were 307 housing units at an average density of 562.2 per square mile (215.5/km). The racial makeup of the village was 97.95% White, 0.58% African American, 0.29% Native American, 0.15% Asian, and 1.02% from two or more races. Hispanic or Latino of any race were 0.88% of the population.

There were 283 households, out of which 28.6% had children under the age of 18 living with them, 56.5% were married couples living together, 8.8% had a female householder with no husband present, and 29.3% were non-families. 25.8% of all households were made up of individuals, and 7.8% had someone living alone who was 65 years of age or older. The average household size was 2.42 and the average family size was 2.89.

In the village, the population was spread out, with 23.8% under the age of 18, 6.4% from 18 to 24, 28.1% from 25 to 44, 30.3% from 45 to 64, and 11.4% who were 65 years of age or older. The median age was 40 years. For every 100 females there were 97.7 males. For every 100 females age 18 and over, there were 100.4 males.

The median income for a household in the village was $46,908, and the median income for a family was $54,375. Males had a median income of $32,917 versus $21,473 for females. The per capita income for the village was $17,625. About 2.3% of families and 2.5% of the population were below the poverty line, including 2.7% of those under age 18 and 7.1% of those age 65 or over.

Geology of area and pre-history
Although most of west central Ohio is a flat landscape intersected with shallow river valleys, Wayne Lakes is located among a series of southwest trending gravel hills over a thick base of limestone. "In the early days of the county, this spot of land was known as the Hills of Judea - named by a famous traveler because the area's beauty reminded him of the Hills of Judea of biblical fame.". These steep hills are known in geology as a kame or esker. "These kames or gravel hills, which range from thirty to sixty feet in height, are almost universally fashioned after one of two types: the first rounded and cone-like, the other elongated". "Moreover, in the relation of the kames to the surrounding soil, there is something very peculiar. It is frequently the case that in the midst of a low, flat, peat bog or black bottom land rise up one, and sometimes more, of these picturesque gravel knolls". "Immediately overlying the Niagara limestone on the land of Mr. Dicky, near Weaver's Station, rest from two to three feet of excellent peat".

Originally heavily forested, these hills consisted of piles and ridges of natural gravel and sand, remnants of the terminal moraines placed by the southern reach of glaciers during the last great Ice Age; "...they are composed of a mass of sand and gravel, intermingled with a small quantity of yellow clay."

Early history of Wayne Lakes area
European explorers established a frontier fort at Fort Jefferson, just across Mud Creek from what is now Wayne Lakes, in 1791. It was named in honor of Thomas Jefferson, then Secretary of State. One of a chain of defensive forts built to protect army supplies from Indians; it served as a supply base throughout the campaigns of General Arthur St. Clair and General Anthony Wayne. Fort Greene Ville, now Greenville, the Darke County seat, is 5 miles to the north; Fort Black, now New Madison, is located 5 miles to the south. "St. Clair had selected a site on a rather low, rounded gravel knoll, about five miles south of modern-day Greenville, Ohio, for the location of his new fort of deposit. Although he said that the site was 'proper enough' for a post, his men thought the location too accessible to the enemy. It was surrounded by small knolls and was susceptible to have the supply of water cut off because the fresh spring that issued nearby was about 100 feet distant". In 1872 timber in the remaining woods consisted of "seven species of Oaks, Sugar maple, Slippery Elm, Beech Black Walnut, Shagbark Hickory, Buckeye, Trembling Aspen (Populus temmuloides), Mulberries, Flowering Dogwood, Crabapple, Honey Locust and Pawpaw."

Describing the gravel and sand knolls, "Between Greenville [Ohio] and Richmond [Indiana], along the Pittsburg, Cincinnati and St. Louis Railroad, they are unusually clustered, and are worked by that company in many points". Noting that the knolls were more than a scenic highpoint in a flatland region, "but what is of more consequence than serving as a relief, in an aesthetic sense, they constitute the great reservoirs from which the material has been supplied to construct so many fine pikes, intersecting the county everywhere, and of which the people are so proud; and which furnished almost at the very spots where most desired for building and other purposes, quantities of the most excellent sand.".

References

External links
 Village website

Villages in Darke County, Ohio
Villages in Ohio